Anterior longitudinal may refer to:

 Anterior interventricular sulcus
 Anterior longitudinal ligament